Quinzanas is one of fifteen parishes (administrative divisions) in Pravia, a municipality within the province and autonomous community of Asturias, in northern Spain.

The population is 77 (INE 2011).

Villages and hamlets
 Docina
 La Vallina
 Entrelaiglesia
 La Reguera
 La Brueva
 El Estornin
 Tranvaregueras
 La Xuiría
 La Cuesta
 El Xardín
 Serrapiu
 Vegañán

References

Parishes in Pravia